CDK5 regulatory subunit-associated protein 3 is a protein that in humans is encoded by the CDK5RAP3 gene.

Neuronal CDC2-like kinase, which is involved in the regulation of neuronal differentiation, is composed of a catalytic subunit, CDK5, and an activating subunit, p25NCK5A. The protein encoded by this gene binds to p25NCK5A and therefore may be involved in neuronal differentiation. The encoded protein, which may be a substrate of neuronal CDC2-like kinase, has also been found in vascular endothelial cells, where it mediates cell proliferation.

References

Further reading

External links